Asit Sen (24 September 1922 – 25 August 2001) was an Indian film director, cinematographer and screenwriter, who worked in both Bengali and Hindi cinema. He was born in Dhaka, now in modern-day Bangladesh, when it was part of East Bengal in British India. He directed 17 feature films in Hindi and Bengali, and was most known for the films Deep Jweley Jai (1959) and Uttar Falguni (1963) in Bengali, Mamta (1966), Khamoshi (1969), Anokhi Raat (1968) and Safar (1970) in Hindi.

Career
Remembered as a prominent filmmaker of his times with a career of more than four decades, making films in different Indian languages, Asit Sen’s contribution in Indian cinema deserves a special mention along with other stalwarts of that era. He is not to be mistaken with actor (Asit Sen).
Born September 24, 1922, in Atishahi village in Bikrampur, Dhaka, Sen was a child with a keen interest towards art. Post his schooling in Nagaon (Assam) he shifted to (Kolkata) for further studies, and in his youth he got drawn towards photography. With the help of his uncle Ramanand Sengupta, who was an established cinematographer, Asit Sen started attending shootings of Hindi films and then joined Bharat Laxmi Productions as an assistant to D.K. Mehta. Soon he became an assistant to his uncle in Purbarag (1947) and then later went on to become an independent filmmaker.

Following his passion, Sen first made a documentary following Mahatma Gandhi’s tours in Noakhali and Patna. With the confidence gained, he then made his directorial debut with the Assamese language film Biplabi in 1948. A few years later he made his first Bengali film Chalachal in 1956, starring Arundhati Devi, which was a success, and many years later he remade the film in Hindi as Safar, which was also a hit. In 1959, he made Deep Jwele Jai (1959), starring Suchitra Sen, set in a psychiatric hospital, which again he remade in Hindi as Khamoshi in 1969, with Rajesh Khanna and Waheeda Rehman. In Mamta (1966), a remake of his 1963 Bengali film Uttar Falguni, a story about class conflict, he excelled as a storyteller. The film had lead actress Suchitra Sen in a double role, and featured memorable songs, "Rahein Na Rahein Hum", sung by Lata Mangeshkar and her soft, almost spiritual duet "Chhupa Lo Yoon Dil Mein Pyar Mera", with Hemant Kumar. Asit Sen then joined National Institute of Film And Fine Arts in 1993 as a teacher and till his death he served in film education for society.

Sen worked with some of the most prominent actors in Bollywood during his career. As director of Khamoshi (1969), he directed Rajesh Khanna, and in Sharafat (1970) he directed  Dharmendra, Hema Malini and Ashok Kumar. In the unique themed movie Annadata (1972), he directed Om Prakash and Jaya Bachchan. In Maa Aur Mamta (1970), he directed Ashok Kumar. in Mamta (1966) Suchitra Sen, Ashok Kumar and Dharmendra. Another engaging story was Bairaag where Asit Sen directed Helen, Madan Puri and Kader Khan, and in Anari (1975), he directed actors Shashi Kapoor, Sharmila Tagore, Moushumi Chatterjee and Kabir Bedi.

Sen was nominated twice for Filmfare Best Director Award, and won once. He was nominated for his direction of Mamta in 1967, and won the award in 1971 for Safar, which starred Rajesh Khanna, Sharmila Tagore and Feroz Khan.

Asit Sen died at a Kolkata hospital on 25 August 2001 at the age of 79. He was survived by his only son Partha Sen.

Filmography

Hindi and Bengali

Awards
 1963 National Film Award for Best Feature Film in Bengali: Uttar Falguni.
 1971: Filmfare Award for Best Director: Safar

References

External links
 
 Asit Sen Profile at Upperstall
 The Two Asit Sens at [Confusion Cleared between Two Asit Sens in The Free Press Journal Article]
 Parivar (1956) and Apradhi Kaun (1957) Two films directed by the actor-comedian Asit Sen at Bobbytalkscinema.com

1922 births
2001 deaths
20th-century Indian film directors
Hindi-language film directors
Bengali film directors
People from Dhaka
Indian male screenwriters
Film directors from Kolkata
Filmfare Awards winners
20th-century Indian screenwriters
20th-century Indian male writers